Abronia chiszari, Chiszar's arboreal alligator lizard, is an endangered species of arboreal alligator lizard in the family Anguidae. The species is native to east-central Mexico.

Taxonomy
A. chiszari was described in 1981 by Hobart Muir Smith and Rozella Blood Smith, his wife.

Etymology
The specific name, chiszari, is in honor of American herpetologist David Chiszar.

Geographic range

Habitat
The preferred natural habitat of A. chiszar is forest.

Reproduction
A. chiszari is viviparous.

References

Further reading
Campbell JA, Frost DR (1993). "Anguid lizards of the genus Abronia: revisionary notes, descriptions of four new species, a phylogenetic analysis, and key". Bulletin of the American Museum of Natural History (216): 1–121. (in English, with an abstract in Spanish).
Clause, Adam G.; Schmidt-Ballardo, Walter; Solano-Zavaleta, Israel; Jiménez-Velázquez, Gustavo; Heimes, Peter (2016). "Morphological Variation and Natural History in the Enigmatic Lizard Clade Scopaeabronia (Sguamata: Anguidae: Abronia)". Herpetological Review 47 (4): 536–543.
Smith HM, Smith RB (1981). "Another Epiphytic Alligator Lizard (Abronia) from Mexico". Bulletin of the Maryland Herpetological Society 17 (2): 51–60. (Abronia chiszari, new species).

Abronia
Lizards of North America
Taxa named by Hobart Muir Smith
Reptiles described in 1981
Endemic reptiles of Mexico